Indiawin Sports Private Limited also colloquially known as MI Universe and #ONEFAMILY is a 100% subsidiary of Reliance Industries founded on 28 November 2007. Based in Mumbai, India, Indiawin Sports owns franchise cricket teams from around the world, including the Mumbai Indians in both the IPL and the WPL, MI Cape Town in the SA20, MI Emirates in the ILT20 & MI New York in Major League Cricket respectively. 

Among its numerous franchises, its most successful has been the Mumbai Indians, which has won the IPL 5 times.

History
Indiawin Sports was founded on 28 November 2007 to buy a franchise cricket team in the IPL. In the 2008 IPL team auction, it successfully bought a team based in Mumbai city for US$111.9 million. Following their team's success, they then wanted to expand their reach and so also bid on teams in the SA20 and the ILT20. It then bought a stake in the US-based Major League Cricket, taking hold of the New York-based franchise. In January 2023, Indiawin Sports also successfully won the bid for Mumbai-based franchise in the Women's Premier League. On 17 March, Mumbai Indians owned one more franchise in Major League Cricket.

Teams owned

Key people
After acquiring franchises in the SA20 and the ILT20, Mumbai head coach Mahela Jayawardene and bowling coach Zaheer Khan were promoted to be the global head of performance and global head of cricket development for Mumbai franchises around the world.

References

Reliance Industries subsidiaries
Organisations based in Maharashtra